Eric Neumayer (born 1970 in Zweibrücken) is a professor of Environment and Development at the London School of Economics and Political Science (LSE) and is Pro-Director of Faculty Development. He holds a Diplom in Economics from  Saarland University, a Master of Science and PhD in Development Studies  from LSE, awarded by the University of London. In 2003, he was awarded a Philip Leverhulme Prize in Geography. He is an Associate of the Center for the Study of Civil War at the Peace Research Institute Oslo.

Contributions
Neumayer uses a set of quantitative economic and environmental economics techniques, largely working from datasets, to assess the causation of violence and conflict, economic development policies, environmental and development policies, health and mortality, and the fate of migrants and human trafficking. He has also worked with data on anti-smoking regulations, student satisfaction and attainment, foreign direct investment, exchange rates, and the mitigation of natural disasters including gender differences.

He is the author of four books: Weak versus Strong Sustainability: Exploring the Limits of Two Opposing Paradigms (4 editions), The pattern of aid giving: the impact of good governance on development assistance, and Greening trade and investment: environmental protection without protectionism. Robustness Tests for Quantitative Research (with Thomas Plümper) was published in 2017. Together with Giles Atkinson and Simon Dietz, he is the editor of the Handbook of Sustainable Development.

Selected journal publications

Neumayer is a prolific scholar. As of 2020, he has been cited 26,000 times and published in excess of 150 articles and book chapters.

 Conditional Spatial Policy Dependence: A Theoretical and Methodological Guide (with Thomas Plümper), Comparative Political Studies, 47 (5), 2012, pp. 819–849
 A Trend Analysis of Normalized Insured Damage from Natural Disasters (with Fabian Barthel), Climatic Change, 113 (2), 2012, pp. 215–237
 Normalizing Economic Loss from Natural Disasters: A Global Analysis (with Fabian Barthel), Global Environmental Change, 21 (1), 2011, pp. 13–24.
 Earthquake Propensity and the Politics of Mortality Prevention (with Philip Keefer and Thomas Plümper), World Development, 39 (9), 2011, pp. 1530–1541.
 Spatial Effects in Dyadic Data (with Thomas Plümper), International Organization, 64 (1), 2010, pp. 145–166.
 Model Specification in the Analysis of Spatial Dependence (with Thomas Plümper), European Journal of Political Research, 49 (3), 2010, pp. 418–442.
 International Terrorism and the Clash of Civilizations (with Thomas Plümper), British Journal of Political Science, 39 (4), 2009, pp. 711–734.
 Famine Mortality, International Food Aid and Rational Political Inactivity (with Thomas Plümper), World Development, 37 (1), 2009, pp. 50–61
 The Gendered Nature of Natural Disasters: The Impact of Catastrophic Events on the Gender Gap in Life Expectancy (with Thomas Plümper), Annals of the American Association of Geographers, 97 (3), 2007, pp. 551–566
 A Missed Opportunity: The Stern Review On Climate Change Fails to Tackle the Issue of Non-Substitutable Loss of Natural Capital, Global Environmental Change, 17 (3-4), 2007, pp. 297–301
 The Unequal Burden of War: The Effect of Armed Conflict on the Gender Gap in Life Expectancy (with Thomas Plümper), International Organization, 60 (3), 2006, 723-754
 Unequal Access to Foreign Spaces: How States Use Visa Restrictions to Regulate Mobility in a Globalised World, Transactions of the British Institute of Geographers, 31 (1), 2006, pp. 72–84
 International technological diffusion, latecomer advantage and economic globalization: a multi-technology analysis (with Richard Perkins), Annals of the American Association of Geographers, 95 (4), 2005, pp. 789–808
 False Prophet, or Genuine Savior? Assessing the Effects of Economic Openness on Sustainable Development, 1980-1999 (with Indra de Soysa), International Organization, 59 (3), 2005, pp. 731–772
 Do international human rights treaties improve respect for human rights?, Journal of Conflict Resolution, 49 (6), 2005, pp. 925–953
 Bogus Refugees? The Determinants of Asylum Migration to Western Europe, International Studies Quarterly, 49 (4), 2005, pp. 389–409

References

External links 
Homepage at LSE

Academics of the London School of Economics
1970 births
Living people
Environmental economists
People from Zweibrücken
Saarland University alumni
Alumni of the University of London